Tony Willman (February 20, 1907 West Allis, Wisconsin – October 12, 1941 Thompson, Connecticut) was an American racecar driver.  He was killed in a midget car accident.

Racing career
Willman started racing in 1926. Limited racing during the 1930s Great Depression significantly hurt Willman's career; only 31 national events were held in eight years. So Willman raced in Midwestern regional and local races. Willman won the 1934/35 indoor midget championship circuit of races in Milwaukee, Detroit, St. Louis, and Chicago.  He toured the Midwest for the 1936 outdoor season and he won 145 races. In 1936, Willman won the Hankinson Speedway Circuit championship; the circuit featured races on 30 tracks in 17 states. He won the 1939 track championship at the quarter mile track inside the Wisconsin State Fair Park Speedway (now Milwaukee Mile); he repeated the track title in 1941.

Willman had misfortune at the Indianapolis 500 with his car breaking down at all four of his races while he was doing well. In 1941, he was running in fourth place at the 285 mile mark before a connecting rod broke. In 1938, Willman drove in relief for Harry McQuinn and finished seventh.

1941 was Willman's most successful year. He won 33 midget car races and the AAA National Short Track championship. One week before his death, Willman lapped the entire 32-car field in a 100-lap midget car event.

Willman died on October 12, 1941. He was racing in a midget car heat race at Thompson International Speedway when he hit the outside wall and he rolled on to the track. The last place car hit and killed him; in the first two laps he had passed 16 cars in the 20 car field. In his career, he had won a single 100-mile Speedway race, 44 sprint car main events, and 85 midget car events.

Career awards
He was inducted in the National Sprint Car Hall of Fame in 1992.

Personal
Willman was known to be soft-spoken and rarely talked about his racing accomplishments. He was well respected by his competitors; Tommy Hinnershitz said that Willman was the toughest driver that he competed against. Willman was married to Lorraine and he left a daughter named Betty and a son named Eugene who ended up becoming a midget car building and owner in the 1960s and 1970s.

Indianapolis 500 results

Reference:

References

1907 births
1941 deaths
Indianapolis 500 drivers
National Sprint Car Hall of Fame inductees
People from West Allis, Wisconsin
Racing drivers from Milwaukee
Racing drivers from Wisconsin
Racing drivers who died while racing
Sports deaths in Connecticut
AAA Championship Car drivers